The 2001–02 St. Francis Terriers men's basketball team represented St. Francis College during the 2001–02 NCAA Division I men's basketball season. The team was coached by Ron Ganulin, who was in his eleventh year at the helm of the St. Francis Terriers. The Terrier's home games were played at the  Generoso Pope Athletic Complex. The team has been a member of the Northeast Conference since 1981.

The Terriers finished the season at 18–11 overall and 13–7 in conference play. They won in the NEC quarterfinals against Monmouth, 71–61, and lost to Central Connecticut State in the semifinals, 54–58.

Against Central Connecticut on December 3, 2001, Bronski Dockery shot 100% from the three-point line, going 7 for 7, which is tied for the NCAA record.

Roster

Schedule and results

|-
!colspan=12 style="background:#0038A8; border: 2px solid #CE1126;;color:#FFFFFF;"| Regular season

|-
!colspan=12 style="background:#0038A8; border: 2px solid #CE1126;;color:#FFFFFF;"| 2002 NEC tournament

References

St. Francis Brooklyn Terriers men's basketball seasons
St. Francis
2001 in sports in New York City
2002 in sports in New York City